The following is a list of notable deaths in March 2001.

Entries for each day are listed alphabetically by surname. A typical entry lists information in the following sequence:
 Name, age, country of citizenship at birth, subsequent country of citizenship (if applicable), reason for notability, cause of death (if known), and reference.

March 2001

1
Erik Aschehoug, 74, French Olympic rower (men's eight rowing at the 1948 Summer Olympics).
Ray Dorr, 59, American college football player (West Virginia Wesleyan) and coach (Southern Illinois, Kentucky, Texas A&M).
Albert Heschong, 82, American television, film and theater production designer (winner of Emmy Award for Art Direction for Requiem for a Heavyweight).
John Painter, 112, American supercentarian, world's oldest man.
Hannie Termeulen, 72, Dutch Olympic freestyle swimmer (bronze medal winner in the 1948 Summer Olympics and two-time silver medal winner in the 1952 Summer Olympics).
Colin Webster, 68, Welsh international footballer.

2
John Diamond, 48, British Journalist.
Louis Faurer, 84, American street photographer.
Lonnie Glosson, 93, American country musician, songwriter, and radio personality.
Wallace D. Hayes, 82, American engineer and one of the world's leading theoretical aerodynamicists.
Harry Stone Mosher, 85, American chemist.

3
Louis Edmonds, 77, American stage, film and television actor (Dark Shadows, All My Children).
Maija Isola, 73, Finnish designer of printed textiles.
Hugh R. Jones, 86, American lawyer and politician (Associate Judge of the New York Court of Appeals).
Eugene Sledge, 77, American Marine and professor.
Rambeer Singh Tomar, 30, Indian Army Non Commissioned Officer, K.I.A.
Ronald Smith, 75, English cricketer.

4
Gerardo Barbero, 39, Argentine chess grandmaster, cancer.
István Blazsetin, 59, Hungarian-Croatian writer and cultural worker.
Glenn Hughes, 50, mustachioed, leather-clad biker of the pop group The Village People, lung cancer.
Brian Jones, 72, British motorcycle designer.
Fred Lasswell, 84, American cartoonist (Barney Google and Snuffy Smith).
Jim Rhodes, 91, American politician (61st and 63rd Governor of the State of Ohio).
Harold Stassen, 93, American politician (25th Governor of Minnesota, candidate for the Republican Party nomination for President of the United States).
Mario Stefani, Italian poet, suicide.
Kalle Tuulos, 70, Finnish figure skater.

5
Peggy Bernier, 93, American comedian and film actress.
Rankin Britt, 85, American football player (Texas A&M, Philadelphia Eagles).
Ian McHarg, 80, Scottish architect.
Frans De Mulder, 63, Belgian road racing cyclist.
Leo Thomas, 77, American baseball player.

6
Mário Covas, 70, Brazilian engineer and politician.
Nane Germon, 91, French actress.
Balla Moussa Keïta, Malian actor and comedian, pulmonary emphysema.
Portia Nelson, 80, American cabaret singer, songwriter, actress (The Sound of Music, Doctor Dolittle, All My Children), and author.
Darrell A. Posey, 53, American anthropologist and biologist, brain tumor.
Jim Taylor, 83, English footballer.
Sir Anthony Tuke, 80, English businessman.
Elda Vokel, 90, American actress.
Kim Walker, 32, American actress (Heathers), brain tumor.

7
Pat Butler, 87, British boxer.
Frankie Carle, 97, American pianist, bandleader and composer ("Sunrise Serenade").
Hank Foldberg, 77, American professional football player (Brooklyn Dodgers, Chicago Hornets) and college football coach (Wichita, Texas A&M).
F. Ray Keyser Sr., 102, American politician and judge.
Al Palladini, 57, Canadian politician, heart attack.

8
Frances Adaskin, 100, Canadian pianist.
Robert Ealey, 75, American electric blues singer.
Bent Hansen, 67, Danish Olympic football player (silver medal winner in men's football at the 1960 Summer Olympics).
David Sandved, 88, Norwegian architect.
Dame Ninette de Valois, 102, British ballet dancer, teacher, choreographer and director of classical ballet.
Edward Winter, 63, American actor (Cabaret, Promises, Promises, M*A*S*H).

9
Vincent Alo, 96, American mobster.
Sumitro Djojohadikusumo, 83, Indonesian economist and politician, heart failure.
Henry Jonsson, 88, Swedish Olympic runner (bronze medal winner in men's 500 metres at the 1936 Summer Olympics).
Mitsuo Kagawa, 78, Japanese archaeologist.
Poldek Pfefferberg, 87, Polish-American Holocaust survivor.
Giancarlo Prete, 58, Italian actor.
Diane Sommerfield, 51, American actress (Days of Our Lives).
Richard Stone, 47, American composer and songwriter (Animaniacs, Pinky and the Brain, Freakazoid!), pancreatic cancer.

10
Arturo Alcaraz, 84, Filipino volcanologist.
Algodão, 76, Brazilian basketball player.
C. J. Eliezer, 82, Ceylon Tamil mathematician and physicist.
Michael Elkins, 84, American broadcaster and journalist (CBS, Newsweek, BBC).
Nicholas Georgiadis, 77, Greek-born British set designer for ballet, stage and film.
Frank Marsh, 76, American politician.
Jorge Recalde, 49, Argentine rally driver born in Mina Clavero, heart attack while racing.
Sir Walter Verco, 94, British officer of arms.
Michael Woodruff, 89, British surgeon and scientist, and a pioneer in organ transplant surgery.

11
Jack Bavin, 79, English footballer.
Finn Ferner, 81, Norwegian Olympic sailor (silver medal winner in 6 metre sailing at the 1952 Summer Olympics).
Rafaela Chacón Nardi, 75, Cuban poet and educator.
Jørn Ording, 85, Norwegian actor and screenwriter.

12
Morton Downey, Jr., 67, American television personality (The Morton Downey Jr. Show), lung cancer.
Alan Greene, 89, American Olympic diver (bronze medal winner in men's 3 metre springboard diving at the 1936 Summer Olympics).
Sir Lancelot, 98, Trinidadian-American singer ("Rum and Coca-Cola") and actor.
Lismonde, 92, Belgian painter and drawer.
Henry Lee Lucas, 64, American convicted killer, natural causes.
Robert Ludlum, 73, American author of spy novels (The Bourne Identity).
Bill Reeder, 79, American baseball player.
Sidney Dillon Ripley, 87, American ornithologist and conservationist.
Victor Westhoff, 84, Dutch botanist.

13
John A. Alonzo, 66, American cinematographer (Chinatown, Scarface, Norma Rae).
Encarnacion Alzona, 105, Filipino historian, and suffragist.
Bill Bland, 84, British communist.
Vincent Dantzer, 77, Canadian politician (member of the House of Commons of Canada, mayor of Edmonton, Alberta).
Walter Dukes, 70, American professional basketball player (New York Knicks, Minneapolis Lakers, Detroit Pistons).
Benny Martin, 72, American bluegrass fiddler.
Cord Meyer, 80, American Central Intelligence Agency official.
Cranley Onslow, Baron Onslow of Woking, 74, British politician.
Vause Raw, 79, South African politician.
Norman Rodway, 72, Irish actor (Royal Shakespeare Company).

14
Arthur Deremer, 83, American professional football player (Brooklyn Dodgers) and coach (University of North Carolina at Charlotte).
Anne George, 73, American author and poet, complications during heart surgery.
Paul Rémy, 78, French tennis player.
Della Sehorn, 73, American competition swimmer.
Herman Tucker, American suspect regarding the murders of Chaney, Goodman, and Schwerner.

15
Fern Battaglia, 70, American baseball player (All-American Girls Professional Baseball League).
Gaetano Cozzi, 78, Italian historian.
Durward Gorham Hall, 90, American politician (U.S. Representative for Missouri's 7th congressional district from 1961 to 1973).
Daniel Sénélar, 75, French painter.
Ann Sothern, 92, American actress (Maisie Ravier film series, The Ann Sothern Show), stroke.

16
Dame Marjorie Bean, 91, Bermudian politician.
Johannes Benzing, 88, German nazi diplomat and linguist.
Sir Edward Howard, 2nd Baronet, 85, British businessman and Lord Mayor of London.
Juliette Huot, 89, Canadian actress (The Plouffe Family, 14, rue de Galais, Amanita Pestilens, The Luck of Ginger Coffey).
Norma MacMillan, 79, Canadian cartoon voice actress (The New Casper Cartoon Show, The Gumby Show, Davey and Goliath).
Henrik Siravyan, 72, Armenian painter.
Nils Slaatto, Norwegian architect.
Bob Wollek, 57, French race car driver.

17
Michiyo Aratama, 71, Japanese actress.
Arthur Covington, 87, Canadian physicist and radio astronomer.
Viktor Krivulin, 56, Russian poet, novelist and essayist.
Maynard Mack, 91, American literary critic and English professor.
Ralph Thomas, 85, English film director.
Zinaida Voronina, 53, Soviet Olympic gymnast who won one gold, one silver and two bronze medals at the 1968 Summer Olympics.

18
Teófilo Borunda, 89, Mexican politician.
Rupert Nurse, 90, Trinidadian musician.
John Phillips, 65, American singer, promoter and co-founder of The Mamas & the Papas, heart failure.
Dirk Polder, 81, Dutch physicist.

19
Robert Blair, 70, American gospel musician (Robert Blair and The Fantastic Violinaires).
Gordon Brown, 53, Scottish rugby union player.
Boris Gregorka, 94, Yugoslavian Olympic gymnast (bronze medal winner at the 1928 Summer Olympics, 1936 Summer Olympics).
Charles K. Johnson, 76, American flat-earther (President of the International Flat Earth Research Society).
Ian Johnston, 71, Australian pioneer of reproductive medicine.
Jacob Kainen, 91, American painter and printmaker.
Norman Mitchell, 82, English actor (It Ain't Half Hot Mum, Oliver!, Beryl's Lot).

20
Luis Alvarado, 52, Puerto Rican baseball player.
Henry Carpenter, 75, British Olympic boxer (men's flyweight at the 1948 Summer Olympics).
Ronald Chetwynd-Hayes, 81, British author, bronchial pneumonia.
Doreen Gorsky, 88, British politician, feminist and television producer and executive (BBC Television).
John J. Hennessey, 79, United States Army general, stroke.
Peter Peltz, American artist.
Hidaya Sultan al-Salem, Kuwaiti journalist and author, shot.
Ilie Verdeț, 75, Romanian communist politician, heart attack.

21
Dora Alonso, 90, Cuban journalist and writer.
Maurice Arreckx, 83, French politician, cancer.
Ken Donahue, 76, American college football player (University of Tennessee) and coach (University of Alabama).
Claus Bork Hansen, 37, Danish organized crime figure, shot.
Bill Johansen, 72, Canadian professional ice hockey player (Toronto Maple Leafs).
Chung Ju-yung, 85, South Korean entrepreneur, businessman and founder of the Hyundai Group, natural causes.
Leonard Rotherham, 87, British metallurgist.
Vernon Sewell, 97, British film director, writer and producer.
Billy Ray Smith, Sr., 66, American football player.
Anthony Steel, 80, British actor and singer (The Wooden Horse, Malta Story, West of Zanzibar, Checkpoint).
Joe Winkler, 79, American gridiron football player.

22
Stepas Butautas, 75, Lithuanian basketball player.
Tony Gibson, 86, English psychologist and anarchist
Sabiha Gökçen, 88, the first Turkish female aviator and the first female combat pilot of the world.
William Hanna, 90, American animator (Tom & Jerry, The Flintstones, Scooby-Doo), co-founder of Hanna-Barbera throat cancer.
Newt Kimball, 85, American baseball player.
Barry Maxwell, 12th Baron Farnham, 69, British aristocrat.
Rolf Birger Pedersen, 61, Norwegian footballer and football coach.
Edward Samuel Smith, 81, American federal judge.
Camp Wilson, 78, American gridiron football player.
Toby Wing, 85, American actress and pin-up star (Palmy Days, True Confession).

23
Dugan Aycock, 92, American professional golfer and golf course designer.
Anthony Bevins, 58, British journalist.
Sully Boyar, 77, American actor (Dog Day Afternoon, Car Wash, Fort Apache, The Bronx, Prizzi's Honor).
Louis Dudek, 83, Canadian poet, academic, and publisher.
Rowland Evans, 79, American journalist and television host (Evans, Novak, Hunt, & Shields).
Alan Green Jr., 75, American diplomat, heart failure.
Arthur D. Hasler, 93, American ecologist, known for explaining salmon's homing instinct.
Willie Horne, 79, British rugby league player.
Margaret Ursula Jones, 84, British archaeologist, known for directing excavations at Mucking, Essex.
Robert Laxalt, Basque-American writer.
Sigurd Lucassen, 73, American labor leader.
David McTaggart, 68, Canadian environmentalist and co-founder of Greenpeace International, car accident.

24
Debabrata Basu, 76, Indian statistician.
Boris Berlin, 93, Russian-Canadian pianist, teacher and composer.
Sonia Bunting, 78, South African journalist and anti-apartheid activist.
Slayton A. Evans, Jr., 57, American chemist.
N. G. L. Hammond, 93, British classical scholar.
Tambi Larsen, 86, Danish-American set designer.
Muriel Young, 77, British television announcer, presenter and producer.
Brian Trubshaw, 77, British test pilot (Concorde).

25
Dominick Basso, 63, American mobster and bookmaker.
Terry C. Johnston, 54, American writer of the Old West.
Tiger Prabhakar, 53, Indian film actor, multiple organ dysfunction syndrome.

26
Michael Cocks, Baron Cocks of Hartcliffe, 71, British politician.
Brenda Helser, 76, American Olympic swimmer (gold medal winner in women's 4 × 100 metre freestyle swimming relay at the 1948 Summer Olympics).
William K. Lanman, 96, American philanthropist.
Fredy Reyna, 83, Venezuelan musician, arranger and performer.
Bill Yates, 79, American cartoonist and comic strip editor, complications from pneumonia and Alzheimer's disease.

27
Jim Ailinger, 99, American basketball and football player.
Sir Kenneth Alexander, 79, Scottish economist.
Anthony Dexter, 88, American actor (Valentino, Captain John Smith and Pocahontas, The Black Pirates, The Story of Mankind).
Robert Lee Massie, 59, American convicted murderer, execution by lethal injection.
Tereza Štadler, 64, Serbian and Yugoslav chess player.
Irene Thomas, 79, British radio personality.

28
Jim Benton, 84, American football player.
George Connor, 94, American racecar driver.
Moe Koffman, 72, Canadian flautist and saxophonist, cancer.
Constantin von Liechtenstein, 89, Liechtenstein prince and alpine skier.

29
Malani Bulathsinhala, 51, Sri Lankan singer.
Myra English, 68, American performer and Hawaiian celebrity ("The Champagne Lady" of Hawaiian music).
Gordon Hahn, 81, American politician (Los Angeles City Council, California State Assembly).
Helge Ingstad, 101, Norwegian writer and explorer, and discoverer of a North American Viking landing site.
John Lewis, 80, American jazz pianist (Modern Jazz Quartet), cancer.
Hollis Sigler, 53, American artist and painter, breast cancer.
Norman Sisisky, 73, American politician, lung cancer.
Rolando Vera, 86, Mexican professional wrestler and wrestling trainer, heart attack.

30
Fatiu Ademola Akesode, 61, Nigerian professor of paediatrics.
Cyrus H. Gordon, 92, American scholar.
George Mutch, 88, Scottish football player.
Gakaara wa Wanjaũ, 80, Kenyan author, historian,  and publisher.

31
Jean-Marc Bory, 67, Swiss actor.
Mariette Bosch, South African murderess, execution by hanging.
Brian Cole, 22, baseball player, car accident.
Edward Jewesbury, 83, English actor,.
Naum Meiman, 88, Soviet mathematician, and dissident.
David Rocastle, 33, English professional footballer, non-Hodgkin's lymphoma.
Clifford Shull, 85, American Nobel Prize-winning physicist.
Coenraad Frederik Strydom, 69, South African rugby player.
Nakamura Utaemon VI, 84, Japanese kabuki performer.
Arthur Geoffrey Walker, 91, British mathematician.
Tochiōyama Yūki, 58, Japanese sumo wrestler.

References 

2001-03
 03